Susirith Mendis is a Sri Lankan physician and academic. He was the Vice-Chancellor of University of Ruhuna for six years and was the Dean of the Faculty of Medicine. He is a Professor of Physiology and founder Director of the Staff Development Centre.

References

External links

Sinhalese physicians
Sinhalese academics
Alumni of Royal College, Colombo
Living people
Vice-Chancellors of the University of Ruhuna
Year of birth missing (living people)
Sri Lankan academics
Sri Lankan medical researchers
People from Colombo